Glendhu Bay is a small settlement on Lake Wānaka in Otago, New Zealand. The bay has a motor camp, and is a short drive west from Wānaka {What is west of W?}, on the road to Treble Cone Skifield and Mount Aspiring National Park.

Notes

Populated places in Otago
Queenstown-Lakes District